One Park Tower is a skyscraper located in the city of Mississauga, Ontario, Canada. It was completed in 2008, stands at 142 meters, and has 38 floors, making it the third tallest building in Mississauga as of 2011. One Park Tower was the tallest building in the city at the time of its completion, but was soon surpassed by the Absolute World towers, standing at 168 and 151 meters. The building is used as a residential condominium.

Amenities 
The 142 m tall building in Mississauga does have a few amenities, such as:
 Concierge
 Rooftop Lounge
 Party Room
 Garden Terraces
 Indoor Swimming Pool
 Fitness Centre
 Media Room
 Dry Cleaner
 Billiards Room

See also 
 List of tallest buildings in Mississauga

References

Residential skyscrapers in Canada
Buildings and structures in Mississauga
Residential buildings completed in 2008